The 2006–07 ECHL season was the 19th season of the ECHL. The league had 25 teams for 2006–07. The Brabham Cup regular season champions were the Las Vegas Wranglers and the Kelly Cup playoff champions were the Idaho Steelheads.

League changes
Two teams returned to the ECHL after suspensions: the Texas Wildcatters and the Cincinnati Cyclones. The Wildcatters had to suspend operations for the 2005–06 season as a byproduct of damage to their home arena caused by Hurricane Rita. The Cyclones returned after ceasing operations following the 2003–04 season in trying to secure an American Hockey League franchise.

The Board of Governors revoked the Greenville Grrrowl franchise and the San Diego Gulls had returned its franchise.

The New Jersey Devils purchased the Trenton Titans and the team became the ECHL affiliate of the Devils. The Titans still maintained their affiliation with the Philadelphia Flyers for the season. After the purchase of the Titans, the New Jersey Devils renamed the franchise's operator Trenton Titans, LLC to Trenton Devils, LLC.

Realignment
At the 2006 pre-season meeting of the ECHL Board of Governors, the ECHL announced the alignment of the 25 teams. The Las Vegas Wranglers were moved from the West to the Pacific Division to replace the departed San Diego Gulls, the returning Texas Wildcatters replaced the Grrrowl in the South Division, and the Cincinnati Cyclones were re-added to the North Division.

Regular season

Final standings
Note: GP = Games played; W = Wins; L= Losses; OTL = Overtime Losses; SOL = Shootout Losses; GF = Goals for; GA = Goals against; Pts = Points; Green shade = Clinched playoff spot; Blue shade = Clinched division; (z) = Clinched home-ice advantage

American Conference

National Conference

Scoring leaders

Note: GP = Games played; G = Goals; A = Assists; Pts = Points; PIM = Penalty minutes

Data referenced from ECHL website

Leading goaltenders
Note: GP = Games played; Min = Minutes played; W = Wins; L = Losses; OTL = Overtime losses; SOL = Shootout losses; GA = Goals against; SO = Shutouts; SV% = Save percentage; GAA = Goals against average

Data referenced from ECHL website

Kelly Cup playoffs

Format
The two unbalanced conferences had separate playoff formats. The 10-team National Conference had the top eight teams advance to the playoffs with the division winners awarded the first and second seeds. The remaining six teams were seeded by points and the four highest seeds faced the lowest remaining seeds. The four remaining teams in the second round would be reseeded by regular season points and the winners would play for a conference championship. All playoff series were best-of-seven. The 15-team American Conference had 10 teams advance to the playoffs but kept an inter-divisional playoff structure. The fourth and fifth seeded teams in each division had a play-in best-of-three series before moving on to the divisional semifinals which were a best-of-five series. The divisional and conference finals were a best-of-seven series. The two conference champions then met in a best-of-seven Kelly Cup final series.

Playoff bracket

National

National quarterfinals

National semifinals

National finals

American

American Divisional quarterfinals

American Divisional semifinals

American Divisional finals

American Conference finals

Kelly Cup finals

Playoff tables referenced from ECHL website.

ECHL awards

See also
 ECHL All-Star Game
 Kelly Cup
 2006 in ice hockey
 2007 in ice hockey

References

External links
ECHL website

 
ECHL seasons
ECHL season, 2006-07